GRESSO is an international company that manufactures luxury eyewear, mobile phones and accessories.  Gresso company was founded in 1999. The trademark is registered in Switzerland (IB of WIPO, reg. No. 994253). Gresso products are presented in Russia, CIS countries, Europe and America.

History
The first collection of mobile phones was presented in 2006, with some made using gold and African blackwood.

In 2007, Forbes magazine included Gresso Avantgarde phone in top 10 most expensive mobile phones in the world.

In August 2007, the company introduced two models of luxury Avantgarde smartphones: Luna and Sol  based on  Windows Mobile 6.0 Standard operation system and Gresso interface. African blackwood and gold were used in case manufacturing.

In August 2009, the company introduced new Gresso Grand Monaco  phone collection. The phone case was made using titanium alloy and covered with several layers of ceramic. Front and back phone panels were made from carbon. The screen was framed in a 42 carat sapphire glass.

In March 2010, the company introduced its first collection of Gresso Grand Monaco phones for women, with some phones made entirely from crocodile leather.

In 2011, Gresso presented new Luxor phone collection. The collection included 3 models:
 Luxor Las Vegas Jackpot  
 Luxor World Time 
 Luxor

In 2011, Gresso introduced new Grand Premiere  mobile handset.

In April 2012, Gresso Regal Black  were introduced. A total of 333 phones was produced at the price of $5000.

In September 2012, Gresso company introduced bumper-case for iPhone 5. Gresso Alligator bumper  is made using tempered titanium.

In 2012, Gresso introduced its first accessories for iPhone 5 and Samsung Galaxy S III.

In December 2013, Gresso launched its first luxury titanium smartphone Gresso Radical (OS Android).

In March 2014, Gresso introduced the most expensive Gresso Titanium Bumpers cost $10000.

See also 
Goldvish
Vertu

References 

Mobile phone manufacturers
Mobile phone companies of Russia